Dalibor Dragić (Serbian Cyrillic: Далибор Драгић; born 23 June 1972) is a Bosnian retired football defender who last played for MBJB FC in the Malaysia Premier League.

Club career
Dalibor started his career playing in FK Borac Banja Luka. His next move was to Serbia to play in the famous FK Vojvodina. In 2000, he signed with PFC Levski Sofia where he was an important defensive player in the three seasons he spend there. In 2003, he had a spell in Austria with SV Mattersburg. He played for Bulgarian PFC Marek Dupnitsa, Borac Banja Luka again, and Azerbaijani club PFC Turan Tovuz, before returning to Serbia and play in FK Mladost Apatin. In 2008, he had an exotic experience in Malaysia in the M-League club Sabah FA. In summer 2010 he moved from Serbian First League club FK Proleter Novi Sad to his hometown club FK Rudar Prijedor.

Personal life
Dalibor Dragić has a wife, Emina Dragić, and he has a son with her, named Aleksa Dragić.

Honours
Levski Sofia
 A PFG Champions: 2001 and 2002
 Bulgarian Cup winner: 2002 and 2003

References

External links
 Profile at Srbijafudbal
 Proleter NS squad details at club's official site
 
 Profile at LevskiSofia.info

1972 births
Living people
People from Prijedor
Serbs of Bosnia and Herzegovina
Association football central defenders
Bosnia and Herzegovina footballers
FK Borac Banja Luka players
FK Vojvodina players
PFC Levski Sofia players
PFC Cherno More Varna players
SV Mattersburg players
PFC Marek Dupnitsa players
Turan-Tovuz IK players
FK Mladost Apatin players
Sabah F.C. (Malaysia) players
FK Proleter Novi Sad players
FK Rudar Prijedor players
Premier League of Bosnia and Herzegovina players
First League of Serbia and Montenegro players
First Professional Football League (Bulgaria) players
Austrian Football Bundesliga players
Azerbaijan Premier League players
Serbian First League players
Malaysia Super League players
Bosnia and Herzegovina expatriate footballers
Expatriate footballers in Serbia and Montenegro
Bosnia and Herzegovina expatriate sportspeople in Serbia and Montenegro
Expatriate footballers in Bulgaria
Bosnia and Herzegovina expatriate sportspeople in Bulgaria
Expatriate footballers in Austria
Bosnia and Herzegovina expatriate sportspeople in Austria
Expatriate footballers in Azerbaijan
Bosnia and Herzegovina expatriate sportspeople in Azerbaijan
Expatriate footballers in Serbia
Bosnia and Herzegovina expatriate sportspeople in Serbia
Expatriate footballers in Malaysia
Bosnia and Herzegovina expatriate sportspeople in Malaysia